Plougastel-Daoulas is a commune in the Finistère department, located in the administrative region of Brittany, northwestern France.

Population
Inhabitants of Plougastel-Daoulas are called plougastels in French.

Breton language
The municipality launched a linguistic plan concerning the Breton language through Ya d'ar brezhoneg on October 28, 2005.

In 2008, 18.98% of primary-school children attended bilingual schools.

Strawberries
The region is famous for its production of strawberries (gariguette de Plougastel).  The New World species of strawberry, Fragaria chiloensis, which had been introduced into France by Amédée-François Frézier (1682–1773), flourished in the marine climate of Plougastel. Gardeners there had observed that this species bore abundant fruit when Fragaria moschata and Fragaria virginiana were planted in alternating rows with it. There had been failed attempts to cultivate fragaria chiloensis in Anjou, Touraine, and the lower-Loire areas.

Tourism
The Albert Louppe Bridge or Plougastel Bridge over the Elorn River is within the commune.

International relations
Plougastel is twinned with Westport, County Mayo, a town in the west of Ireland, and also with Saltash, a town in the south-east of Cornwall, United Kingdom.

Paintings depicting Plougastel-Daoulas

Churches and chapels in Plougastel-Daoulas

Église Saint-Pierre
The parish church was damaged during the bombing of the 22 and 23 August 1944 and subsequently rebuilt. It contains a notable "rosary" altarpiece and a "mise au Tombeau" both from the old church.

Chapelle Saint-Adrien
This chapel has an interesting 17th-century sculpture in wood entitled "Saint Martin et le Pauvre". It depicts Saint Martin's charitable works. See old postcard above showing the sculpture.

The chapel contains many statues of saints.

Chapelle Saint-Jean
Dating to the 15th century, enlarged in 1607 and restored in 1780. This chapel is associated with a pardon known as the "Pardon des Oiseaux".

Chapelle Saint-Guénolé
Dedicated to the founder of the abbey at Landévennec, the chapel was restored in 1896. A beam in the chapel bears the date 1514 and by the chevet window there is a stone inscribed "M. I. Le Galle. Cariou. v. 1706". The altarpiece dates to the 17th century and was restored in 1993. There is a statue in polychromed wood of Saint Guénolé in the chapel to the left side of the altarpiece. There are two triptychs in the chapel. One is the Saint Caradec triptych and the other is the Saint Louis triptych.

Chapelle Notre-Dame-de-la-Fontaine-Blanche
This was once the priory of the abbey of Daoulas. The clock tower dates to 1702. There are three altars in the chapel dedicated to Saint Lawrence, Saint Mary Magdalene and the Virgin Mary ("Notre-Dame"). These were consecrated in 1508 by Jean Davesnes.

Chapelle  Saint-Claude
Dates to the 16th century. The date 1652 is inscribed above the main entrance. A statue of saint-Claude on a throne is placed by the altarpiece by the main altar. Other dates inscribed are "H. et D. Le Maucaire prieur recteur de Plougastel Jan Corre Fabrique 1661" on the west façade, "Jehan Le Gall Fabrique 1661" on the gable of the south wing and in the sacristy "1747". A painting by Yves Hen in the chapel dates to 1661.

Other calvaries
Of the many calvaries around Plougastel-Daoulas, two involve the sculptor Roland Doré (sculptor).
 The Calvary of Saint-Claude dates to 1630) and has sculptures depicting Saint Peter, Saint Yvese  and a Pietà.
 The Calvary at Saint-Guénolé.

The mystery of Plougastel
Not far from nearby Anse du Caro, a message is carved on a rock, beginning with "grocar drear diozeevbio", followed on by other writings in an unknown language. The text includes enigmatic drawings, such as a heart linked to a cross, and a sailboat close to the sea. Two numbers on the rock are decryptable: 1786 and 1787.

See also
Communes of the Finistère department
The calvary of Plougastel-Daoulas
Plougastel-Daoulas Parish Close
List of the works of the Maître de Plougastel
List of the works of the Maître de Thégonnec

References

External links

Official website
 Site sur Plougastel Daoulas
 Musée de la fraise
 La course du pont sur l'Elorn - May, 15 2010
G.M. Darrow, The Strawberry: History, Breeding and Physiology
  |Plougastel-Daoulas  Cultural Heritage

Communes of Finistère